Archibald George McCormick (23 February 1899 – 8 February 1969) was a New Zealand rugby union player. A hooker, McCormick represented  and Ashburton County at a provincial level. After playing two games for Canterbury in 1924 McCormick was selected for the New Zealand national side, the All Blacks, on their 1925 tour of New South Wales but, as one of three hookers in the touring party, only played in one match. He did not appear in any Test matches.

He was also the national amateur heavyweight boxing champion in 1922 and 1923.

References

1899 births
1969 deaths
Rugby union players from Christchurch
New Zealand rugby union players
New Zealand international rugby union players
Canterbury rugby union players
Mid Canterbury rugby union players
Rugby union hookers
New Zealand male boxers